Kunle Idowu,, popularly known as Frank Donga, is a Nigerian actor and comedian. He rose to fame through the webseries, The Interview, on Ndani TV about an unassuming job-seeker for which he was nominated for Best Actor in a Comedy in the Africa Magic Viewers Choice Award in 2015. He has gone on to feature in several movies like The Wedding Party and its sequel The Wedding Party 2. Previously working as a journalist, he also works as a photographer and a filmmaker.

In 2022, he and Philomaine Nanema co-presented Hello Doc, a series intended to encourage COVID-19 immunisation in Africa.

Education 
Idowu attended Ogun State University (now Olabisi Onabanjo University) where he obtained a B.Sc in Agricultural Science and also the University of Ibadan, where he obtained a master's degree in Animal Genetics.

Filmography

Awards and nominations

Africa Magic Viewers' Choice Awards 

!Ref
|-
|2015
|Kunle Idowu/The Interview (web series)
|Best Actor in a Comedy
|
|
|-
|2018
|Frank Donga/Idahosa Trials
|rowspan="2"|Best Supporting Actor
|
|

Africa Movie Academy Awards 

!Ref
|-
|2018
|Frank Donga/Hakkunde
|Best Actor in a Leading Role
|
|

The African Film Festival (TAFF) 

!Ref
|-
|2018
|Frank Donga
|Best Actor
|
|

References 

Yoruba male actors
Year of birth missing (living people)
Living people
Nigerian YouTubers
Nigerian male comedians
University of Ibadan alumni
Olabisi Onabanjo University alumni
Nigerian film award winners
Nigerian comedians
Nigerian film directors
Nigerian photographers
Nigerian male film actors